Jandieri was a Georgian noble family known from the seventeenth century as grandees in the Kingdom of Kakheti.

According to the genealogical treatise by Prince Ioann of Georgia (1768–1830), the family was elevated, in 1628, to the princely rank by the king Teimuraz I of Kakheti. After the Russian annexation of Georgia, the family was recognized by the Imperial order as princes  Jandierov or Jandieri  Джандиери) in 1829.

One of the members of the Jandieri family, Joseph, served as the Catholicos of Georgia from 1755 to 1764, and has been canonized by the Georgian Orthodox Church.

References 

Noble families of Georgia (country)
Russian noble families
Georgian-language surnames
Kingdom of Kakheti